Helsinki shipyard may refer to the following shipyards, which have operated in Helsinki.

 Hietalahti shipyard, a 1865 founded shipyard in Hietalahti; operated by:
 Helsingfors Skeppsdocka (1865–1894)
 Sandvikens Skeppsdocka och Mekaniska Verkstad (1895–1938)
 Wärtsilä Hietalahti Shipyard (1938–1965)
 Wärtsilä Helsinki Shipyard (1966–1986)
 Wärtsilä Marine Helsinki Shipyard (1987–1989)
 Masa-Yards Helsinki New Shipyard
 Kværner Masa-Yards Helsinki New Shipyard
 Aker Finnyards Helsinki Shipyard (2005–2006)
 Aker Yards Helsinki Shipyard (2006–2008)
 STX Finland Helsinki Shipyard (2008–2011)
 Arctech Helsinki Shipyard (2010–2019)
 Helsinki Shipyard (2019→)
 Suomenlinna shipyard, a dockyard in Suomenlinna, built in the 18th century
 Katajanokka shipyard, the old Valmet yard in Katajanokka from 1951 to the 1970s
 Vuosaari shipyard, the new Valmet yard in Vuosaari from 1974 to 1987
 Kone- ja Siltarakennus shipyard in Sörnäinen from 1891 to the 1920s